Marcos Gabriel Fernández (born April 20, 1993 in Matilde, Argentina) is an Argentine footballer currently playing for Güemes.

References
 
 

1993 births
Living people
Argentine footballers
Argentine expatriate footballers
Club Atlético Colón footballers
San Luis de Quillota footballers
Sportivo Las Parejas footballers
Unión de Sunchales footballers
Sarmiento de Resistencia footballers
San Martín de San Juan footballers
Estudiantes de Río Cuarto footballers
Rangers de Talca footballers
Chilean Primera División players
Argentine Primera División players
Primera Nacional players
Torneo Federal A players
Argentine expatriate sportspeople in Chile
Expatriate footballers in Chile
Association football midfielders